The Champion Bay Group is a stratigraphic group in Australia, it was deposited in the Bajocian stage of the Middle Jurassic. The limestones of the group have provided ammonites.

References

Further reading 
 R. L. Hall. 1989. Lower Bajocian ammonites (Middle Jurassic; Soninniidae) from the Newmarracarra Limestone, Western Australia. Alcheringa 13:1-20

Geologic groups of Oceania
Geologic formations of Australia
Jurassic System of Australia
Bajocian Stage
Sandstone formations
Shale formations
Limestone formations
Shallow marine deposits
Geology of Western Australia